In chemistry, an electrofuge is a leaving group which does not retain the lone pair of electrons from its previous bond with another species (in contrast to a nucleofuge, which does). It can result from the heterolytic breaking of covalent bonds.
After this reaction an electrofuge may possess either a positive or a neutral charge; this is governed by the nature of the specific reaction.

The word 'electrofuge' is commonly found in older literature, but its use in contemporary organic chemistry is now uncommon.

See also
Nucleofuge
Nucleophile
Electrophile

References

 .

Organic chemistry